Russowia is a genus of Asian plants in the tribe Cardueae within the family Asteraceae.

Species
The only known species is Russowia sogdiana, native to Kazakhstan, Kyrgyzstan, Xinjiang, Tajikistan, Uzbekistan, Afghanistan and Turkmenistan.

References

Flora of Asia
Cynareae
Monotypic Asteraceae genera